Hodsoll is a surname. Notable people with the surname include:

Frank Hodsoll (1938–2016), American art historian
Kyle Hodsoll (born 1988), Bermudian cricketer
William Hodsoll (1718–1776), English cricketer